Wuyue culture refers to the regional Chinese culture of the Wuyue people, a Han Chinese subgroup that has historically been the dominant demographic in the region of Jiangnan (entirety of the city of Shanghai and the province of Zhejiang, the southern portion of Jiangsu province and the eastern portion of Anhui province). Wuyue culture is characterized as being delicate, graceful and refined, having preserved many unique cultural traditions nonextant in other regions of China.

Language

Literature

Music

Arts

Opera styles

Philosophy and religion

Heritage sites

Cultural items

Cuisine

Others

See also
 Culture of Shanghai
 Zhongyuan culture
 Culture of Jiangxi
 Hokkien culture
 Hakka culture
 Cantonese culture
 Chinese culture

References

Chinese culture
Culture in Shanghai
Culture in Zhejiang
Culture in Jiangsu
Culture in Anhui